Many Springs is an unincorporated community in Oregon County, in the U.S. state of Missouri.

History
A post office called Many Springs was established in 1875, and remained in operation until 1907. The community was so named on account of the many springs near the original town site.

References

Unincorporated communities in Oregon County, Missouri
Unincorporated communities in Missouri